Enfield Center is an unincorporated community in the town of Enfield in Grafton County, New Hampshire. It is a separate community from the much larger village of Enfield, which is located in the northern corner of the town.

Enfield Center is located, as the name suggests, near the geographic center of the town of Enfield. The Knox River flows north through the village on its way from George Pond to Mascoma Lake.

Enfield Center has a separate ZIP code (03749) from the rest of the town of Enfield. Two of its buildings are listed on the National Register of Historic Places; the Centre Village Meeting House (also known as the Union Church) and the Enfield Center Town House.

References

Unincorporated communities in New Hampshire
Unincorporated communities in Grafton County, New Hampshire
Enfield, New Hampshire